Henry Clay Overstreet was a member of the Florida House of Representatives from 1862 to 1864 and from 1865 to 1867.

He was born in Emanuel County, Georgia, the son of Daniel Overstreet, and Martha Alberson. He moved to Orlando, Florida in 1856 and to Kissimmee, Florida in 1860.

Barber–Mizell feud 
He was among the belligerents of the Barber–Mizell feud among the Mizells, Barbers, Yateses and Overstreets.

See also 
 List of members of the Florida House of Representatives from Brevard County, Florida

References 

1821 births
1879 deaths
Methodists from Florida
Members of the Florida House of Representatives
People from Brevard County, Florida
People from Emanuel County, Georgia
People from Kissimmee, Florida
People from Orlando, Florida
19th-century American politicians